HMS Amazon was a  built for the Royal Navy in the first decade of the 20th century. She survived the First World War and was sold in 1919. During the First World War she served in the North Sea and the English Channel with the 6th Destroyer Flotilla.

Notes

References

External links
 HMS Amazon, Index of 19th Century Naval Vessels
  OldWeather.org transcription of ship's logbooks August to October 1916

 

Tribal-class destroyers (1905)
Ships built in Southampton
1908 ships
World War I destroyers of the United Kingdom